Alexis Michalik, born 13 December 1982, is a Franco-British actor, scriptwriter and director. He adapted Shakespeare's Romeo and Juliet into his play R & J and he has written and staged his own plays, including Le Porteur d'histoire, Le Cercle des illusionnistes, Edmond and Intra Muros. He has acted in a number of films, including Sagan by Diane Kurys and Le Chant du loup by Abel Lanzac and he has acted in a number of TV series, mini-series, and TV films, including the series Kaboul Kitchen by Allan Mauduit and Jean-Patrick Benes. He has received various Molière awards for his plays.

Education
He is the son of a Polish father, an artist, and a British mother. He was raised in the quartier des Abbesses in the 18th arrondissement of Paris. He studied at the collège Jules-Ferry, and at the conservatoire in the 19th arrondissement, and he passed the entrance examination for the Conservatoire national d'art dramatique.

Career

Theatre director and scriptwriter 
His first stage role was as Roméo in 2001, in the play Juliette et Roméo directed by Irina Brook at the théâtre de Chaillot.

In 2003, he was admitted to the Conservatoire national supérieur d'art dramatique (CNSAD) in Paris. However, he gave up his place to stage his first show, Une folle journée, an adaptation of Mariage de Figaro by Beaumarchais. He created the show in 2005 at the Festival d'Avignon Off in the théâtre des Corps Saints, playing the role of the Count. Michalik used the name of his source material to name his theatre company, Los Figaros.

In 2006, he created La Mégère à peu près apprivoisée at Théâtre La Luna (Buffon), a musical comedy adaptation of the play by Shakespeare, in which he played the role of Petruchio. He met Arthur Jugnot, who produced the play in Avignon in 2007 et 2008, at the théâtre des Béliers, then in 2009 at the Vingtième Théâtre and then in 2010 at Le Splendid. The adaption was then put on television on the show Paris Première. During this show, he met Dominique Besnehard, the show's host, who would later produce two of Michalik's first short films.

In 2008, he created R&J, an adaptation of Roméo et Juliette by Shakespeare for three actors. In this production, he played various roles, including Romeo. The play was done in the théâtre des Béliers in Avignon, and then at the Ciné 13 Théâtre and at Studio des Champs-Elysées.

In 2010, he adapted and directed the second act of Carmen by Bizet, in a show titled Carmen Rock & Soul Opéra. The show, which was put on at the Festival des Mises en capsules, starred the singer Julie Zenatti in the title role and Christophe Mali (Tryo) playing Don José, and 20 other actors, singers, dancers and musicians. The show as done at Ciné 13 Théâtre.

Then Benjamin Bellecour, co-director of Ciné 13 Théâtre, invited Michalik to write and direct Michalik's first play, Le Porteur d'histoire. The play was done in a shortened form at the Festival Faits d'Hiver. In July 2011, the play was done in its current form at Théâtre des Béliers . The play came back to Avignon in 2012 and also was done in Paris at Théâtre 13 Jardin, where it was received well by the public and critics. His play was done again at the Studio des Champs-Élysées in February 2013 and at Théâtre des Béliers in 2017.

In January 2014, he wrote his second play, Le Cercle des illusionnistes, which was produced at the théâtre de La Pépinière in Paris. The play blends fictional elements with the biography o Robert-Houdin and filmmaker Georges Méliès. It was performed in 2014 and it was also performed at the Théâtre des Béliers parisiens.

Le Porteur d'histoire and Le cercle des illusionnistes were both nominated for the Molières 2014 award in the categories of Meilleur Spectacle de Théâtre Privé, Meilleur Auteur Francophone Vivant, and Meilleur Metteur en Scène de Théâtre Privé. Le cercle des illusionnistes was also nominated for Molière de la révélation féminine (by Jeanne Arènes) and Molière de la Création Visuelle (by Marion Rebmann, Olivier Roset, and Pascal Sautelet).

Alexis Michalik won two Molière awards in 2014 : Auteur et Metteur en scène. Jeanne Arènes was also recognized.

In 2016, he created Edmond at Théâtre du Palais-Royal, a play that explored that challenging creation of Cyrano de Bergerac by Edmond Rostand. The dramaturg was played by the comedian Guillaume Sentou. In the 2017 Molière awards, Edmond got seven nominations : Molière du Théâtre privé, Molière de la Comédie, Molière du Comédien dans un second rôle, Molière de la Révélation masculine, Molière de l'auteur francophone vivant, Molière du Metteur en scène d'un spectacle de Théâtre privé and Molière de la Création visuelle.

In 2017, he created Intra Muros at Théâtre 13, a play that was part of a theatre course in a prison; it examined the history of various characters. The play's lead actors included Jeanne Arènes, Bernard Blancan, Alice de Lencquesaing, Paul Jeanson and Faycal Safi.The music and soundtrack were done on stage by Raphaël Charpentier.

Television and film acting 
Michalik appeared in the television series Diane, femme flic on TF1 between 2002 and 2004, playing the role of lieutenant Sam. He then had roles in a number of TV films, series and sagas, including Petits meurtres en famille and Terre de lumière on France 2. He acted in the films Sagan by Diane Kurys, L'Autre Dumas by Safy Nebbou, L'Âge de raison by Yann Samuell, Des gens qui s'embrassent by Danièle Thompson, La Banda de Picasso by Fernando Colomo, and 24 jours, la vérité sur l'affaire Ilan Halimi by Alexandre Arcady...

Since 2012, he has played the role of Damien in the series Kaboul Kitchen on Canal+. In 2015, he was part of the Anglophone cast of Versailles, for Canal+.

Director and screenwriter 
In 2013, Michalik did his first short film, Au Sol, which drew on the blog Rue89. The film, which was released in September 2014 on France 2, garnered 30 selections and 15 festival prizes.

In 2014, he did his second short film, Pim-Poum le petit Panda for the Talents Cannes Adami. This musical comedy was co-written with Benjamin Bellecour.

In January 2019, he did his first full-length film Edmond, an adaptation of his play.

Filmography

Actor

Filmmaker

Theater

References

Annexes

Bibliography 

 Interview

External links 

 Audiovisual resources :
 Allociné
 (en) Internet Movie Database

 Theatre resources :
 Les Archives du spectacle
 Théâtres parisiens associés
 Site officiel de l'agence Simpson
 Star(t) / Émission du 29 janvier 2013 sur Radio Campus Paris

21st-century French dramatists and playwrights
French theatre directors
French male actors
1982 births
Living people